Hyatt Regency Indianapolis, also known as PNC Center, is a mixed-use high-rise in Indianapolis, Indiana. The structure was completed in 1977, and was designed by architectural firm Browning Day Pollak Associates. It was originally named Merchants Plaza and was the headquarters of Merchants National Bank and Trust Company, which had previously been located in the Merchants National Bank Building.

As a result, if Merchants National's acquisition by the Ohio-based National City Corporation in 1992, Merchants Plaza was renamed National City Center in August 1995 to reflect the name of the new bank owner. National City Center served as the new bank's Indiana regional headquarters. The building was later renamed PNC Center in 2010 after National City's acquisition by PNC.

The building currently is home to a 499-room Hyatt Regency hotel and commercial offices; a revolving restaurant is also located on the building's top floor in a small circular tower elevated from the main roof of the building. The Hyatt Regency Indianapolis is the tallest mixed-use building in the city, and the second tallest building in the city located south of Washington Street. To allow for the construction of the Hyatt Regency, a full-block building, several shorter high-rises were demolished; among these were the Lincoln Hotel and the D. Sommers & Company Building.

According to the Indianapolis Business Journal, the Hyatt Regency Indianapolis has 220 full-time employees and was last renovated in 2018. As of 2020, four dining options were located in the hotel, including the Eagle's Nest, Level One Lounge, Fat Rooster Diner, and Starbucks.

See also
List of tallest buildings in Indianapolis
List of tallest buildings in Indiana

References

External links

Hyatt Regency Indianapolis official website

Skyscraper hotels in Indianapolis
Skyscraper office buildings in Indianapolis
Office buildings completed in 1977
Hyatt Hotels and Resorts
Buildings and structures with revolving restaurants
Hotel buildings completed in 1977
1977 establishments in Indiana